This is a timeline documenting events of Jazz in the year 1938.

Events
 Benny Goodman performs  The Famous 1938 Carnegie Hall Jazz Concert.

Standards

Deaths

 May
 25 – Dick McDonough, American guitarist and composer (born 1904).

 April
 10 – Joe "King" Oliver, American cornet player and bandleader (born 1885).

 August
 16 – Robert Johnson, American guitarist, singer, and composer (born 1911).

 Unknown date
 Garnet Clark, American pianist (born 1917).

Births

 January
 13 – Daevid Allen, Australian poet, guitarist, singer, and composer, Soft Machine and Gong (died 2015).
 17 – Alf Kjellman, Norwegian saxophonist (died 2010).
 24 – Julius Hemphill, American composer and saxophonist (died 1995).
 25
 Etta James, American singer (died 2012).
 Gennady Golstain, Russian clarinetist, reed player, composer, and teacher.
 27 – Jimmie Smith, American drummer.

 February
 1 – Jimmy Carl Black, American drummer and singer of The Mothers of Invention (died 2008).
 11 – Slim Richey, American jazz guitarist (died 2015).
 17 – John Coates Jr., American pianist (died 2017).
 23 – Wilson Simonal, Brazilian singer (died 2000).
 24 – Louie Ramirez, American percussionist and vibraphonist (died 1993).
 28 – Mike Wofford, American pianist.

 March
 7 – Petr Skoumal, Czech pianist and composer (died 2014).
 9
 Lill-Babs or Barbro Svensson, Swedish singer and actress (died 2018).
 Marzette Watts, American saxophonist (died 1998).
 Roy Brooks, American drummer (died 2005).
 15 – Charles Lloyd, American tenor saxophonist and flautist.
 23 – Dave Pike, American vibraphone and marimba player (died 2015).
 24 – Steve Kuhn, American pianist and composer.
 29 – Laco Déczi, Slovak-American trumpeter and composer.

 April
 2
 Booker Little, American trumpeter and composer (died 1961).
 Sal Nistico, American tenor saxophonist (died 1991).
 6 – Al Arsenault, American blues and jazz organ player (died 2007).
 7
 Alexander von Schlippenbach, German pianist and composer.
 Freddie Hubbard, American trumpeter (died 2008).
 Pete La Roca, American drummer (died 2012).
 10 – Denny Zeitlin, American pianist and composer.
 13 – Eddie Marshall, American drummer (died 2011).
 14 – Monty Waters, American saxophonist, flautist, and singer (died 2008).
 18
 Bob Parlocha, American jazz expert and radio host (died 2015).
 Hal Galper, American pianist and composer.
 27 – Ruth Price, American singer.

 May
 2 – Fred Braceful, American-German drummer (died 1995).
 12 – Jimmy Hastings, British saxophonist, Canterbury scene.
 13 – Ross Tompkins, American pianist (died 2006).
 23 – Daniel Humair, Swiss drummer and composer.
 26 – Jaki Liebezeit, German drummer (died 2017).

 June
 6 – Luigi Trussardi, French upright bassist (died 2010).
 9 – Eje Thelin, Swedist trombonist (died 1990).
 11 – Stu Martin, American drummer (died 1980).
 15 – Tony Oxley, English drummer.
 18 – Don "Sugarcane" Harris, American violinist (died 1999).
 20 – Dennis Budimir, American guitarist.

 July
 1 – Robert Schulz, American cornetist.
 3 – Rhoda Scott, African-American organist.
 4 – Mike Mainieri, American vibraphonist.
 10
 Arnie Lawrence, American saxophonist (died 2005).
 Lee Morgan, American trumpeter (died 1972).
 14 – Tommy Vig, Portuguese vibraharpist, drummer, percussionist, big band leader, and composer.
 18
 Buschi Niebergall, German musician (died 1990).
 Dudu Pukwana, South African saxophonist (died 1990).
 26 – Joanne Brackeen, American pianist.
 31 – Gap Mangione, American pianist, composer, arranger, and bandleader.

 August
 13 – Michael Joseph Smith, American composer and pianist.
 15 – Stix Hooper, American drummer.

 September
 7 – Jon Mayer, American pianist and composer.
 17 – Perry Robinson, American clarinetist and composer (died 2018).
 20 – Eric Gale, American guitarist (died 1994).
 28
 Gerd Dudek, German saxophonist, clarinetist and flautist.
 Ray Warleigh, Australian-born saxophonist and flautist (died 2015).

 October
 2
 Kjell Bartholdsen, Norwegian saxophonist (died 2009).
 Gugge Hedrenius, Swedish pianist and bandleader (died 2009).
 4 – Mark Levine, American jazz pianist, trombonist, and composer.
 5 – Jean-Pierre Gebler, Belgian saxophonist (died 2006).
 15 – Fela Kuti, Nigerian multi-instrumentalist, saxophonist, and composer (died 1997).
 22 – Harrison Ridley Jr., American jazz presenter (died 2009).
 24 – Odean Pope, American tenor saxophonist.
 26 – John "Jabo" Starks, American drummer (died 2018).

 November
 12 – Warren Bernhardt, American pianist.

 December
 9 – William Thomas McKinley, American composer and pianist (died 2015).
 11 – McCoy Tyner, American pianist (died 2020).
 19 – Pete Strange, English trombonist (died 2004).
 28
 Charles Neville, American R&B saxophonist, The Neville Brothers (died 2018).
 Dick Sudhalter, American trumpeter and criti (died 2008).

 Unknown date
 Barry Buckley, Australian upright bassist (died 2006).
 Pat LaCroix, Canadian musician and photographer.
 Peter King, Nigerian alto saxophonist.

References

External links 
 History Of Jazz Timeline: 1938 at All About Jazz

Jazz, 1938 In
Jazz by year